Gurugram Public School (known as GPS) is a K-12 school located in Sector 55 and Sector 62 Gurgaon.

History
The school was started in the year 2001 at Sector 55 Gurgaon and further expended into another school in sector 62. School is affiliated to Central Board of Secondary Education, New Delhi.

Facilities
The school provides the following facilities :
 Library
 Equipped laboratories
 Language lab
 CCTV Cameras in class Rooms
 Sports complex
 Transport facilities

School has CCTV monitoring and Smart Boards in Class Rooms. School also offer Day boarding facilities for the students.

Activities
The school organizes many activities for their students e.g. sports sessions, awareness programs etc. In this sequence, a Disaster Management Workshop was organised at School by the Green Locus (an organization that provides unique Himalayan experiences) where the theme was ‘Responsible living by learning from the wisdom of nature and the Himalayas’. The Workshop was conducted by trainers from Adventure Guide Welfare Society (AGWS), Nainital.

See also
Education in India
Literacy in India  
Amity International School, Gurgaon
List of institutions of higher education in Haryana

References

External links
 Gurugram Public School – Official Website
 CBSE Website

Private schools in Haryana
Primary schools in India
High schools and secondary schools in Haryana
Schools in Gurgaon
Educational institutions established in 2001
2001 establishments in Haryana